Tom Jones (born 7 October 1964) is an English football coach and former player who played as a midfielder.

Career
After starting his career with Weymouth he was signed by Aberdeen, and played 28 league games for them in 1987–88.

Jones then moved to Swindon Town, playing his first Football League game for them in 1988–89. He went on to make 168 league appearances for Swindon, before moving to Reading.

After 79 league matches for Reading he moved to Woking. He then played a season for Forest Green Rovers, before playing four years at Swindon Supermarine and ending his active career at Shrivenham.

In 1999 during his time at Swindon Supermarine Jones was persuaded by Swindon Town manager Jimmy Quinn to become youth coach at the club. Jones left the position in 2000 when Quinn was sacked.

He later had a brief stint as manager of Swindon Supermarine before traveling to South Korea in 2004 to join Busan I'Park manager Ian Porterfield as his assistant manager.

When Porterfield became manager of the Armenia national team in 2006, Jones followed him as assistant. When Porterfield died from cancer of the colon on 11 September 2007, Jones and Vardan Minasyan were placed temporarily in charge of the national team.

Jones later became assistant manager at Swindon Supermarine, before stepping down from his role in February 2011, at the same time as the manager Mark Collier.

In November 2013 Mark Collier was named new manager of Chippenham Town with Jones once again as his assistant. Jones left his position as assistant manager in January 2018.

Honours 
Woking
 FA Trophy: 1996–97

References

1964 births
English footballers
English football managers
Armenia national football team managers
Living people
Weymouth F.C. players
Aberdeen F.C. players
Swindon Town F.C. players
Reading F.C. players
Woking F.C. players
Swindon Supermarine F.C. players
Scottish Football League players
English Football League players
Association football midfielders
Sportspeople from Aldershot
Expatriate football managers in Armenia
Shrivenham F.C. players
Forest Green Rovers F.C. players
Footballers from Hampshire